Streptomyces zhaozhouensis is a bacterium species from the genus of Streptomyces which has been isolated from the surface of a leaf of the plant candelabra aloe in Zhaozhou in the Heilongjiang Province in China.

See also 
 List of Streptomyces species

References

Further reading

External links
Type strain of Streptomyces zhaozhouensis at BacDive – the Bacterial Diversity Metadatabase

zhaozhouensis
Bacteria described in 2014